Tuanku Syed Sirajuddin ibni Almarhum Tuanku Syed Putra Jamalullail (Jawi: توانكو سيد سراج الدين ابن المرحوم توانكو سيد ڤوترا جمال الليل; born 17 May 1943) is the 7th and current Raja of Perlis, reigning since 17 April 2000.  He served as the 12th Yang di-Pertuan Agong of Malaysia from 13 December 2001 to 12 December 2006.

Early life and education

Tuanku Syed Sirajuddin was born in Arau, Perlis, the second of ten children of Almarhum Tuanku Syed Putra Jamalullail and Tengku Budriah binti Almarhum Tengku Ismail.  He studied at the Arau Malay School until standard two, then from 5 January 1950 he continued his primary education at Wellesley Primary School in Penang followed by Westland Primary School until the end of 1955. Tuanku Syed Sirajuddin began his secondary education at Penang Free School on 9 January 1956 and later left for England to study at Wellingborough School for four years until 1963. He underwent training as a Cadet Officer at the Royal Military Academy in Sandhurst, England, from January 1964 until December 1965.

Early career

Upon his return from England, Tuanku Syed Sirajuddin served with the Ministry of Defence Malaysia. His first post was as Second Lieutenant in the 2nd Regiment of the Malaysian Reconnaissance Corps on 12 December 1965. In 1966, he was transferred to Sabah and then to Sarawak in 1967. He then served in Pahang for several years until he resigned on 31 December 1969 to return to Perlis. He was promoted to the rank of Lieutenant in December 1967.

In 1970, he served in the armed forces again, as Captain of the Local Territorial Army from 16 November 1970 until 1 October 1972. He was promoted to Major on 1 October 1972. Presently, he is the Commanding Officer of Regiment 504 of the Army Reserve Unit with the rank of Colonel.

Raja of Perlis
In October 1960, he was appointed the Raja Muda (Crown Prince) of Perlis while still a student.  Tuanku Syed Sirajuddin ibni Almarhum Tuanku Syed Putra Jamalullail was installed as the twelfth ruler of Perlis on 17 April 2000, the day after the death of his father, Tuanku Syed Putra ibni Almarhum Syed Hassan Jamalullail, who had been Raja since 1945, and was at that time the world's longest reigning monarch.

Yang di-Pertuan Agong

Continuing the tradition of the Yang di-Pertuan Agong rotation, Tuanku Syed Sirajuddin was elected as the 12th Yang di-Pertuan Agong of Malaysia, his term began on 13 December 2001. This was earlier than expected because the previous and 11th Yang di-Pertuan Agong, Almarhum Sultan Salahuddin Abdul Aziz Shah Al-Haj ibni Almarhum Sultan Sir Hisamuddin Alam Shah Al-Haj, passed away in office on 21 November 2001 while his term should have ended in 2004. At that time, he was the fastest ruler to become the Yang di-Pertuan Agong from his accession to his state's throne, at 1 year & 241 days (record now held by Al-Sultan Abdullah). Tuanku Sirajuddin's term ended on 12 December 2006.

Personal life

On 15 February 1967 he married Tengku Fauziah binti Almarhum Tengku Abdul Rashid D.K., S.S.P.J., S.P.M.P. (born 6 June 1946) at Kota Bharu, Kelantan, daughter of Tengku Temenggong Tengku Abdul Rashid ibni Almarhum Sultan Sulaiman Badrul Alam Shah of Terengganu, by his wife Tengku Maharani Putri Tengku Kembang Puteri binti Almarhum Sultan Ibrahim of Kelantan, who became the Raja Puan Muda of Perlis. Tuanku Syed Sirajuddin was appointed for the first time as the Regent of Perlis when the Raja of Perlis and the Raja Perempuan of Perlis travelled to the United States and Europe from 23 June 1967 until 24 October 1967. 

Tuanku Syed Sirajuddin has one son and one daughter :
His Royal Highness Tuanku Syed Faizuddin Putra, Raja Muda of Perlis (born on ) 
Her Highness Sharifah Fazira, Tengku Puteri Mahkota of Perlis (born on ).

Tuanku Syed Sirajuddin has travelled to many countries including United Kingdom, France, Germany, Denmark, Austria, Italy, Switzerland, Egypt, Spain, Libya, the Netherlands, Belgium, Thailand and Saudi Arabia.

Tuanku Syed Sirajuddin is also active in sports. Among his favourite sports are golf, tennis, football and is a fan of Tottenham Hotspur football club. He has been the Chairman of Putra Golf Club, Perlis since May 1971, and the patron of the Association of Football Referees of Perlis since 1967. He was also the Chairman of the Football Association of Perlis for 18 years.

Ancestry

Social contributions
Tuanku Syed Sirajuddin interacts frequently with his people through various fields and heads many social organisations, which are:
 Chairman of the Rayuan Binaan Wisma Pahlawan Negeri Perlis and Chairman of the Exhibition Committee of the Malaysian Royal Armed Forces in Perlis on 1 April 1971.
 Chairman of the Association of Malaysian Ex-Servicemen, Perlis branch for five years.
 Chairman of the Rayuan Derma Hari Pahlawan Negeri Perlis since 1972.
 Patron of 4B Youth Movement of Perlis.

Tuanku Syed Sirajuddin is renowned for his dedication towards his people and takes great interest in education. With the establishment of the Tuanku Syed Putra Foundation in 1986, many Perlis students have been able to further their studies locally and abroad. Tuanku Syed Sirajuddin is the Chairman of this foundation.

Tuanku Syed Sirajuddin became directly involved in religious affairs when he was appointed President of the Islamic Council of Perlis by the late Almarhum Tuanku Syed Putra, the then ruler of Perlis, Tuanku Syed Sirajuddin is especially concerned that the religious affairs of the state are based on the 'Ahlis Sunnah Waljamaah' doctrine. In this regard, Tuanku Syed Sirajuddin is constantly in touch with the religious leaders of Perlis.

Awards and recognitions

Tuanku Syed Sirajuddin held the rank of Marshal of the Royal Malaysian Air Force, Admiral of the Fleet, Royal Malaysian Navy and Field Marshal, Malaysian Army in light of his duties as Supreme Commander of the Malaysian Armed Forces, thus becoming the third royal ruler to rise from the ranks as an active military officer to the rank of supreme commander-in-chief. 
Colonel-in-Chief, Royal Ranger Regiment

He has been awarded:

Honours of Perlis 
 : 
  Founding Grand Master of the Royal Family Order of Perlis (since 17 May 2001)
  Grand Master of the Perlis Family Order of the Gallant Prince Syed Putra Jamalullail (since 17 April 2000)
  Grand Master of the Order of the Gallant Prince Syed Sirajuddin Jamalullail (since 2001)
  Grand Master of the Order of Prince Syed Sirajuddin Jamalullail of Perlis (since 2005)
 Order of the Gallant Prince Syed Putra Jamalullail : Knight Grand Companion (SSPJ, 4 December 1995) and Grand Master (since 17 April 2000)
  Grand Master of the Order of the Crown of Perlis (since 17 April 2000)

Honours of Malaysia 
  (as Yang di-Pertuan Agong of Malaysia) : 
  Recipient (DKM, 2002) and Grand Master of the Order of the Royal House of Malaysia (DKM, 13 December 2001)
  Order of the Crown of the Realm : Recipient (DMN, 2001) and Grand Master (13 December 2001 – 12 December 2006)
  Grand Master of the Order of the Defender of the Realm (13 December 2001 – 12 December 2006)
  Grand Master of the Order of Loyalty to the Crown of Malaysia (13 December 2001 – 12 December 2006)
  Grand Master of the Order of Merit of Malaysia (13 December 2001 – 12 December 2006)
  Grand Master of the Order for Important Services (Malaysia) (13 December 2001 – 12 December 2006)
  Grand Master of the Order of the Royal Household of Malaysia (13 December 2001 – 12 December 2006)
  Malaysian Service Medal (PJM, 17 April 2009)
  : 
  Knight Grand Commander of the Order of the Crown of Johor (SPMJ)
  : 
  Member of the Royal Family Order of Kedah (DK, 21 January 2002)
  : 
  Recipient of the Royal Family Order or Star of Yunus (DK, 2002)
  : 
  Member of the Royal Family Order of Negeri Sembilan (DKNS, 19 July 2001)
  : 
  Member 1st class of the Family Order of the Crown of Indra of Pahang (DK I, 26 October 2005)
  : 
  Recipient of the Royal Family Order of Perak (DK)
  Grand Knight of the Order of Cura Si Manja Kini (the Perak Sword of State, SPCM)
  : 
  First Class of the Royal Family Order of Selangor (DK I, 14 December 2002)
  : 
  Member second class of the Family Order of Terengganu (DK II) 
  Member Grand Companion of the Order of Sultan Mahmud I of Terengganu (SSMT, 8 October 1998)

Foreign honours 
  : Recipient of the Royal Family Order of the Crown of Brunei (DKMB, 10 August 2002) 
  : 
 Grand Collar of the National Order of Independence (16 December 2002)
 Grand Cross of the Royal Order of Cambodia (16 December 2002)
  : Recipient of the Grand Order of King Tomislav
  : Grand Cross of the National Order of the Legion of Honour (8 May 2004)
  : Commander Grand Cross with Collar of Order of the White Rose of Finland (19 September 2005)
  : Knight Grand Cross with Collar of the Order of Merit of the Italian Republic (9 June 2003)
  : 
 Collar of the Order of the Chrysanthemum (7 March 2005) 
 Grand Cordon of the Order of the Sacred Treasure (22 February 1970)
  : Collar of Badr Chain
  : Member 1st Class of the Order of Temasek (DUT, 11 April 2005)
  : Knight of the Royal Order of the Seraphim (14 September 2005)
  : Member 1st Class of the Order of Umayyad (7 May 2004)

Places named after him
Several places were named after him, including:
 Persiaran Tuanku Syed Sirajuddin (formerly known as Persiaran Duta) in Kuala Lumpur
 Politeknik Tuanku Syed Sirajuddin in Arau, Perlis
 Sirajuddin Mosque in Padang Pauh, Perlis
 Kem Syed Sirajuddin, a military camp in Gemas, Negeri Sembilan
 SMK Syed Sirajuddin, a secondary school in Arau, Perlis
 SK Kem Syed Sirajuddin, a primary school in Gemas, Negeri Sembilan

References

 BBC News – country profile for Malaysia
 UiTM Chancellor –  Chancellor of Universiti Teknologi MARA

Monarchs of Malaysia
Sirajuddin
1943 births
Living people
Sirajuddin
Graduates of the Royal Military Academy Sandhurst
Marshals of the Royal Malaysian Air Force
Sirajuddin
Malaysian people of Arab descent
Malaysian people of Malay descent
Malaysian Muslims
People educated at Wellingborough School

Recipients of the Darjah Kerabat Diraja Malaysia
First Classes of Royal Family Order of Selangor
Knights Grand Commander of the Order of the Crown of Johor
Members of the Royal Family Order of Kedah
First Classes of the Family Order of Terengganu
Members Grand Companion of the Order of Sultan Mahmud I of Terengganu

 
Grand Croix of the Légion d'honneur
Knights Grand Cross with Collar of the Order of Merit of the Italian Republic
Knights Grand Cross of the Royal Order of Cambodia
Recipients of the Order of the Sacred Treasure, 1st class
Recipients of the Darjah Utama Temasek
21st-century Malaysian politicians
Recipients of the Order of the Crown of the Realm
Recipients of the Order of Merit of Malaysia